IROC XXIII was the twenty-third season of IROC, the (International Race Of Champions), which started on February 12, 1999. It  was the closest race and points battle ever. It was held at Michigan International Speedway in which Dale Earnhardt beat his son Dale Earnhardt Jr. The other three contested races were held at Daytona International Speedway, Talladega Superspeedway, and Indianapolis Motor Speedway. Earnhardt won the first three races of the season, including two last lap passes at Daytona and Talladega to win the championship and $225,000.

The roster of drivers and final points standings were as follows:

Notes
1. Adrian Fernandez did not compete in the last race in Indianapolis, Dave Marcis ran the event and finished 9th.

External links
 Racing-Reference 1999 IROC Drivers and Standings 
1999 IROC Drivers Announced

International Race of Champions
1999 in American motorsport